The Fortress Resort & Spa, traded as The Fortress Resorts PLC, is a luxury boutique hotel in Koggala, Sri Lanka. The resort was incorporated in 1973. The resort is listed on the Colombo Stock Exchange. In 2003, Sri Lankan entrepreneur, Dhammika Perera acquired a controlling stake in the resort. The resort was formerly known as Club Horizon Hotel, Koggala and was renamed to its current name in the same year. The hotel was affected by the 2019 Easter bombings. The resort is designed like a fortress to enclose a Dutch-era villa.

History
The resort was incorporated in 1973 under the name Ruhunu Hotels and Travels Limited. In 1999, the resort was listed on the Colombo Stock Exchange. The resort was formerly known as Club Horizon Hotel, Koggala. Sri Lankan entrepreneur, Dhammika Perera acquired a controlling stake of 56.07% of the resort in 2003. Connaissance Hotels were designated to manage the resort. The resort adopted its current name in December 2003.

In 2016, the resort moved to build a five-star resort at a cost of LKR2.1 billion in Weligama. the resort's subsidiary, La Forteresse invested LKR364 million to build the 66-roomed resort. La Forteresse bought  of land from LB Finance, a company held by Dhammika Perera. The resort was affected by the 2019 Sri Lanka Easter bombings, 750 room night bookings were cancelled due to the attack.

Operations

The resort is designed like a fortress enclosing a Dutch villa. The resort made headlines for offering a dessert priced at US$14,500 in 2007. The resort called it the most expensive dessert in the world. The Fortress Stilt Fisherman Indulgence is a gold leaf cassata flavoured with Irish cream. The dessert is served with mango, pomegranate compote and Champagne sabayon. The dessert is ornated with a chocolate carving of a fisherman on a stilt and an 80-carat aquamarine.

The Fortress Resort won the Bocuse d'Or Sri Lanka prize for the second time in 2019. The resort won the Bocuse d'Or Sri Lanka award for the first time and fifth place in the Bocuse d'Or South East Asia in 2015. The hotel was also included in the “Considerate Collection” by Small Luxury Hotels of the World. This collection included 26 actively sustainable hotels.

Amenities
The Fortress is located in Koggala, a coastal town in Southern Province, Sri Lanka,  from Galle. The main restaurant of the resort is called White. It serves Sri Lankan buffets and seafood grills. An à la carte menu is also available. Salty Snapper offers fish seafood. The fine dining restaurant of the resort is Duo. The restaurant is housed in a glassed cellar which contains a 2,000 wine collection. T-lounge serves high teas, pastries and cheesecake. The spa of the resort has won several awards over the years. The spa provides Ayurvedic treatments, aromatherapy and other eastern and far-eastern treatments. The hotel also includes a gym and meetings, incentives, conferencing, exhibitions (MICE) facilities.

See also
 List of hotels in Sri Lanka
 List of companies listed on the Colombo Stock Exchange

References

External links
 Official website

1973 establishments in Sri Lanka
Hospitality companies of Sri Lanka
Hotels established in 1973
Hotels in Kandy
Companies listed on the Colombo Stock Exchange